Sekiu Airport  is a public airport serving the small community of Sekiu, in Clallam County, Washington, United States. It is owned by the Port of Port Angeles.

Facilities and aircraft 
Due to a 900 ft (275 m) displaced threshold, aircraft approaching from the west (runway 08) have only 2097 feet (639 m) on which to land.

For the 12-month period ending December 31, 2005, the airport had 498 aircraft operations: 95% general aviation and 5% air taxi.

References

External links 
 Sekiu Airport at Port of Port Angeles
 Sekiu Airport at Washington State DOT

Airports in Washington (state)